The 22nd Battalion, Virginia Infantry Regulars was raised in Virginia for service in the Confederate States Army during the American Civil War and, served as infantry. It fought mostly with the Army of Northern Virginia.

22nd Infantry Battalion was organized with six companies of the 2nd Regiment, Virginia Artillery. It served in Field's, Heth's, and H.H. Walker's Brigade, and fought with the Army of Northern Virginia from Cedar Mountain to Cold Harbor, then was involved in the Petersburg siege south of the James River.

On December 22, 1864, the battalion was disbanded and its members distributed among other Virginia commands.

It reported 7 casualties at Cedar Mountain, 22 at Second Manassas, 27 at Fredericksburg, and 29 at Chancellorsville. Ten percent of the 237 engaged at Gettysburg were disabled.

The field officers were Lieutenant Colonels James C. Johnson and Edward P. Tayloe, and Major John S. Bowles.

See also

List of Virginia Civil War units

References

Units and formations of the Confederate States Army from Virginia
1861 establishments in Virginia
Military units and formations established in 1861
Artillery units and formations of the American Civil War
1865 disestablishments in Virginia
Military units and formations disestablished in 1865